958 Asplinda (prov. designation:  or ) is a resonant Hilda asteroid, approximately  in diameter, located in the outermost region of the asteroid belt. It was discovered on 28 September 1921, by astronomer Karl Reinmuth at the Heidelberg Observatory in southwest Germany. The assumed C-type asteroid has a rotation period of 16.5 hours and is likely elongated in shape. It was named after Swedish astronomer Bror Asplind (1890–1954).

Orbit and classification 

Asplinda is a member of the distant orbital Hilda group of asteroids, which stay in a 3:2 orbital resonance with Jupiter. It is however not a member of the collisional Hilda family but a non-family asteroid of the background population when applying the hierarchical clustering method to its proper orbital elements. It orbits the Sun in the outermost asteroid belt at a distance of 3.2–4.7 AU once every 7 years and 11 months (2,905 days; semi-major axis of 3.98 AU). Its orbit has an eccentricity of 0.18 and an inclination of 6° with respect to the ecliptic. The body's observation arc begins at Heidelberg on 24 October 1921, four weeks after its official discovery observation.

Naming 

This minor planet was named after Bror Ansgar Asplind (1890–1954), a Swedish astronomer and orbit computer. The following, sequentially numbered asteroids 959 Arne, 960 Birgit and 961 Gunnie are named after his three children, respectively. The  was mentioned in The Names of the Minor Planets by Paul Herget in 1955.

Physical characteristics 

No spectral type has been published for Asplinda. As an Hildian asteroid with a low albedo (see below) it is a carbonaceous C-type asteroid (assumed), or possibly a D-type or P-type asteroid, which are very common among the Hildian and more distant Jupiter trojan population.

Rotation period and poles 

In December 2017, a rotational lightcurve of Asplinda was obtained from photometric observations by Brian Warner, Robert Stephens and Daniel Coley at the Center for Solar System Studies  in California. Lightcurve analysis gave a rotation period of  hours with a high brightness amplitude of  magnitude, indicative of an elongated, non-spherical shape.

The 2017 observations by Warner, Stephens and Coley also gave two spin axes of (228.0°, 33.0°) and (46.0°, 45.0°) in ecliptic coordinates (λ, β) and a sidereal period of  hours.

These results supersede the asteroid's 2016 modeled spin axes and lightcurve with a sidereal period of  hours based on data from the Uppsala Asteroid Photometric Catalogue, the Palomar Transient Factory survey, and individual observers led by Czech astronomers Josef Hanuš and Josef Ďurech, as well as sparse-in-time photometry from the NOFS, the Catalina Sky Survey, and the La Palma surveys .

Diameter and albedo 

The Collaborative Asteroid Lightcurve Link adopts the results from IRAS, that is, an albedo of 0.0415 and a diameter of 47.08 km based on an absolute magnitude of 10.71. An asteroid occultation on 15 August 2006, gave a best-fit ellipse dimension of 47.0 × 47.0 kilometers. These timed observations are taken when the asteroid passes in front of a distant star. However the quality of the measurement is poorly rated.

Notes

References

External links 
 Lightcurve Database Query (LCDB), at www.minorplanet.info
 Dictionary of Minor Planet Names, Google books
 Discovery Circumstances: Numbered Minor Planets (1)-(5000) – Minor Planet Center
 
 

000958
Discoveries by Karl Wilhelm Reinmuth
Named minor planets
000958
19210928